Sainte-Anne-du-Lac is a municipality and village in the Laurentides region of Quebec, Canada, part of the Antoine-Labelle Regional County Municipality.

The village itself is located at the northern terminus of Quebec Route 309, on the south shore of Lake Tapani.

History
Settlement began around 1870. In 1916, the Parish of Sainte-Anne-du-Lac was formed, and the following year, the first school was built. Also in 1917, the Township of Décarie was established, and incorporated as a township municipality in 1920. It was named in honour of Jérémie-Louis Décarie. The township municipality used to extend to the Lièvre River, but the south-eastern portion was ceded in 1928 to the then newly created Municipality of Mont-Saint-Michel.

In 1950, the village itself separated from the township to form the Village Municipality of Sainte-Anne-du-Lac.

On December 30, 1976, the township and village municipalities merged to form the current Municipality of Sainte-Anne-du-Lac.

Demographics

Private dwellings occupied by usual residents (2021): 299 (total dwellings: 422)

Mother tongue:
 French as first language: 95.65%
 English as first language: 2.61%
 English and French as first language: 0.87%
 Other as first language: 0.87%

Local government

List of former mayors:
 Aimé Lachapelle (...–2013)
 Annick Brault (2013–2021)
 Jocelyne Lafond (2021–present)

See also
List of municipalities in Quebec

References

External links

Designated places in Quebec
Incorporated places in Laurentides
Municipalities in Quebec